Leslie Kish (born László Kiss, July 27, 1910 – October 7, 2000) was a Hungarian-American statistician and survey methodologist.

Life and career
Kish emigrated with his family to the USA in 1925. His father soon died, and Kish helped support the family by working while continuing his studies in the evenings. In 1937 he volunteered for the International Brigade to fight against Francisco Franco in the Spanish Civil War. He saw action in a Hungarian battalion, was wounded, and returned to the United States in 1939. In 1939, he finished his baccalaureate in mathematics at the City College of New York.

He worked at the U.S. Bureau of the Census from 1940 until 1941, when he moved to the Division of Program Surveys of the Department of Agriculture. For the remainder of World War II he served as a meteorologist in the U.S. Army Air Corps. After the war he returned to the Department of Agriculture, but in 1947 he joined the University of Michigan faculty. He moved to the University of Michigan as a member of the newly created Survey Research Center, which in 1949 became a unit of the new Institute for Social Research (ISR). While working full-time, Kish received an M.A. in mathematical statistics in 1948 and a Ph.D. in sociology in 1952. He became a lecturer at the University of Michigan in 1951, an Associate Professor in 1956, a professor in 1960 and professor emeritus in 1981".

Awards and honors
In 1997, the American Statistical Association gave Kish their Wilks Memorial Award. The award citation read: "For being a truly outstanding statistician, who has had a profound influence on sample survey practice throughout the world. His originality and ability to provide practical solutions to real-world statistical problems illuminate his extensive writings; a notable example is his classic text Survey Sampling, which is widely consulted and referenced by practitioners of statistics everywhere. His wisdom and guidance have benefited countless colleagues and students from America and abroad. For his remarkable work as an applied statistician in consistently using his knowledge and insight for the benefit of society. At the Survey Research center of the Institute of Social Research at the University of Michigan, he has been a leader in many areas — administration, intellectual creativity, research, training, and mentorship. His influential role in the World Fertility Survey further illustrates his impact as an international ambassador of statistics and a tireless advocate for scientific statistical methods. For being a humanitarian and true citizen of the world. His unmatched concern for those living in less fortunate circumstances and his use of the statistical profession to help is an inspiration for all statisticians".

Selected publications
Kish, Leslie. Statistical Design for Research. New York: Wiley. 1987. .
. .
. On the basis of this paper, Kish's name is associated with the Kish grid.

See also
 Kish grid

References

External links
 A conversation with Leslie Kish
 "Leslie Kish Papers: 1952-2001," in Bentley Historical Library, University of Michigan: "The papers date from 1952 to 2001 and are divided into six series: Biographical Information, University of Michigan Administrative and Course Materials, Papers and Presentations, Institute of Social Research, Organizations and Activities, and Personal and Professional Correspondence".
 Verma, Vijay. "Leslie Kish: Development of Statistics Internationally." Proceedings of Statistics Canada Symposium 2001. 2001. pdf

Presidents of the American Statistical Association
Fellows of the American Statistical Association
Survey methodologists
American statisticians
American sociologists
Abraham Lincoln Brigade members
University of Michigan faculty
Hungarian emigrants to the United States
1910 births
2000 deaths
20th-century American mathematicians
University of Michigan alumni